Johnny Summers (10 September 1927 – 2 June 1962) was a football striker who scored 104 goals for Charlton Athletic.

Summers engineered one of the most remarkable comebacks in football history; Charlton were 5-1 down against Huddersfield with half an hour to go with only 10 men; they won 7-6 in the Second Division at The Valley, 21 December 1957. Johnny scored five goals, set up two and scored a six-minute hat-trick. Summers later revealed that he changed his boots at half-time after his old pair had started falling apart.

Johnny Summers played for Norwich City, Fulham and Millwall, prior to his Charlton career. He made his debut for Millwall in 1954 in the opening match of the 1954–55 season, against Brighton and Hove Albion, in front of a 25,000 plus crowd at The Den. In a 2–0 win, he disappointed the fickle crowd and after a few weeks disappeared into the Reserves, surfacing again the following January, as a left winger. From that time, he never looked back, and was one of the most fearsome and lethal forwards seen at The Den in years. His transfer to Charlton Athletic, for their last season in the old First Division, was regretted by Millwall fans, but seen as inevitable.

He died at the age of just 34 in 1962 of cancer.

References

External links
 The 10 greatest comebacks of all time
 

1927 births
1962 deaths
Norwich City F.C. players
Fulham F.C. players
Millwall F.C. players
Charlton Athletic F.C. players
English footballers
English Football League players
Association football forwards
Deaths from cancer in England
Footballers from Hammersmith